is the capital city of Fukui Prefecture, Japan. , the city had an estimated population of 264,217, and a population density of 69.2 persons per km2, in 102,935 households. Most of the population lives in a small central area; the city limits include rural plains, mountainous areas, and suburban sprawl along the Route 8 bypass.

Overview

Cityscape

Geography
Fukui is located in the coastal plain in north-central part of the prefecture. It is bordered by the Sea of Japan to the west and the Ryōhaku Mountains to the east. The Kuzuryū River flows through the city.

Climate
Fukui has a humid subtropical climate (Köppen climate classification Cfa) with hot, humid summers and cool winters. Precipitation is high throughout the year, and is especially heavy in December and January.

Neighbouring municipalities
Fukui Prefecture
Sakai
Ōno
Katsuyama
Sabae
Ikeda
Eiheiji
Echizen (town)

Demographics
Per Japanese census data, the population of Fukui has remained relatively steady over the past 40 years.

History

Origins
Fukui was part of ancient Echizen Province.

Sengoku Period
In 1471, Asakura had displaced the Shiba clan as the shugo military commander of Echizen Province. The same year, Asakura Toshikage (1428–1481) fortified the Ichijōdani by constructing hilltop fortifications on the surrounding mountains and constructing walls and gates to seal off the northern and southern end of the valley. Within this area, he contracted a fortified mansion, surrounded by the homes of his relatives and retainers, and eventually by the residences of merchants and artisans, and Buddhist temples. He offered refuge to people of culture or skills from Kyoto attempting to escape the conflict of the Ōnin War, and the Ichijōdani became a major cultural, military, and population center, and by the time of Asakura Takakage (1493–1548) it had a peak population of over 10,000 inhabitants. Yoshikage succeeded his father as head of the Asakura clan and castle lord of Ichijōdani Castle in 1548.

The Asakura maintained good relations with the Ashikaga shogunate, and thus eventually came into conflict with Oda Nobunaga. Following Nobunaga's capture of Kyoto, Shōgun Ashikaga Yoshiaki appointed Asakura Yoshikage as regent and requested aid in driving Nobunaga out of the capital. As a result, Nobunaga launched an invasion of Echizen Province. Due to Yoshikage's lack of military skill, Nobunaga's forces were successful at the Siege of Kanegasaki and subsequent Battle of Anegawa in 1570, leaving the entire Asakura Domain open to invasion.

Ichijōdani was razed to the ground by Nobunaga during the 1573 Siege of Ichijōdani Castle.

Kitanosho Castle is known, though that it was built by Shibata Katsuie in 1575. Also, it appears that the tenshu (keep) was nine stories high, making it the largest of the time.

Edo Period
Castle town and centre of Fukui Domain during the Edo period Tokugawa shogunate. 
Fukui Domain played a key role in the Meiji restoration. 
The modern city of Fukui was founded with the creation of the modern municipalities system on April 1, 1889.

Meiji, Taisho & Showa Period
During the pre-war period, Fukui grew to become an important industrial and railroad centre. Factories in the area produced aircraft parts, electrical equipment, machine motors, various metal products and textiles.

Fukui was largely destroyed on June 19, 1945 during the Bombing of Fukui during World War II.  Of the city's  at the time, 84.8% of Fukui was destroyed, per the United States Army Air Forces's Strategic Bombing Survey.

Modern Fukui
Fukui was again devastated by a major earthquake in 1948.

On February 1, 2006, the town of Miyama (from Asuwa District), the town of Shimizu, and the village of Koshino (both from Nyū District) were merged into Fukui.

Fukui's city status was designated a core city on April 1, 2019.

Government

Fukui has a mayor-council form of government with a directly elected mayor and a unicameral city legislature of 32 members. The city also contributes 12 members to the Fukui Prefectural Assembly. In terms of national politics, Fukui forms part of Fukui 1st district, a single-member constituency of the House of Representatives in the national Diet of Japan.

External relations

Twin towns – sister cities

International
Fukui is twinned with:
Sister Cities

Friendship Cities

National
Sister Cities

Friendship cities

Partnership cities

Economy

The economy of Fukui is mixed. The city is a regional commercial and finance centre; however, manufacturing, agriculture and commercial fishing also are contributors to the local economy.

Primary sector of the economy

Agriculture
Japan Agricultural Cooperatives（JA）
Fukui Prefecture Agricultural Cooperatives（JA FukuiPrefecture）

Fishing industry
Japan Fisheries cooperative（JF）
FukuiCity Fisheries cooperative（JF FukuiCity）

Secondary sector of industry

Manufacturing industry
Fukui is home to several companies, including:
Matsuura Machinery, an international heavy machinery manufacturing company
Morinaga Hokuriku Dairy, a dairy products subsidiary of Morinaga Milk Industry
Kumagai Gumi, a large general construction company, was founded and has its registered head office in the city.

Tertiary sector of industry

Service industry
Emori Shoji, a trading house with strong ties to China
Keifuku Bus

Education

Universities and colleges
Fukui Prefectural University
University of Fukui
Fukui University of Technology
Jin-ai Women's College
Fukui College of Health Sciences

Secondary schools

Fujishima Senior High School
Koshi Senior High School
Fukui Commercial Senior High School
Usui Senior High School
Asuwa Senior High School
Michimori Senior High School
Kagaku-Gijutsu Senior High School
Fukui Norin Senior High School
Hokuriku Senior High School
Fukui University of Technology - Fukui Senior High School
Jin-ai Girl's Senior High School
Keishin Senior High School
Fukui Minami Senior High School

Other schools
Fukui Prefectural School for the Blind
Fukui Prefectural School for the Deaf
A North Korean school: Hokuriku Korean Elementary and Junior High School (北陸朝鮮初中級学校).

Transport

Railways

High-speed rail
West Japan Railway Company (JR West)
Hokuriku Shinkansen： (under construction)

Conventional lines
West Japan Railway Company (JR West)
Hokuriku Main Line：Echizen-Hanandō - (Minami-Fukui Freight Terminal) - Fukui - Morita
Etsumi-Hoku Line (Kuzuryū Line)： -  -  -  -  -  -  -   -   -   -  - 
 Fukui Railway
Fukubu Line： -  -  -  -  -  -  -  -  -  -  -  -  - 
 Echizen Railway
Mikuni Awara：  -  -  -  -  -  -  -  -  -  -  - Jin'ai Ground-Mae - 
Katsuyama Eiheiji Line：  -  -  -  -  -  -  -

Roads

Expressways
  Hokuriku Expressway

Japan National Route

Seaways

Sea Port
Port of Takasu

Visitor attractions

 Ichijōdani Asakura Family Historic Ruins, one of the most important cultural heritage sites in Japan
 Yōkōkan Garden
 Fukui Castle
 Fukui Fine Arts Museum
 Kitanosho Castle
 Asuwa River
 Harmony Hall Fukui
 Fukui International Activities Plaza
 "Yoroppaken", creator of Fukui's trademark dish, 
 Peace Pagoda, the second of its kind in the world, inaugurated in 1959

Culture

Sports

Baseball
Fukui Wild Raptors（BC.League）

Handball
Hokuriku Electric Power Company Blue Thunder（JHL）

Soccer
Fukui United FC（Hokushinetsu Football League）

References

External links

 

 
Cities in Fukui Prefecture
Port settlements in Japan
Populated coastal places in Japan